Pledging My Love is the first studio album Filipino star singer-actress Nora Aunor made in collaboration with another Filipino singer and performer, Manny de Leon. It had a 1970 LP release in the Philippines by Alpha Records Corporation and nearly thirty years later, in 1999, was issued in a compilation/cd format. The album consists of love songs popular during the 1960s, some of which are sung as duets by Aunor and de Leon, who was the leading man in some of her 1970 film vehicles.

Background
1970 was one of Nora Aunor's busiest years — she starred in eighteen films and Manny de Leon appeared with her in ten of these. Their first film together was 1969's Nora (Single Girl), with the viewing public accepting them as a love team and making their movies into blockbusters. Alpha Records took advantage of their singing talents and decided to issue a collaboration album featuring them performing a series of songs about love and romance.

Track listing

Side one

Side two

References

See also
 Nora Aunor Discography

Nora Aunor albums
1970 albums